Eero Veikka Juhani Gustafsson, known as Veikka Gustafsson (born 14 January 1968) is a Finnish mountaineer who has ascended all 14 eight-thousanders in the world without the use of supplemental oxygen. He is also known for presenting a TV travel show on Finnish television.

Climbing career
In 1993, Gustafsson became the first Finnish person to have reached the top of Mount Everest. In the spring of 1997, he also became the first Finn to have climbed to the summit without the use of bottled oxygen.  Gustafsson is the 17th mountaineer in the world to have summited all 14 of the highest mountains above 8,000 metres, and the 9th to have done so without the use of supplemental oxygen. Research published in 2022 estimated that Gustafsson is one of only three climbers to have stood on the "true" geographical summit of all the eight-thousanders, and that he was the second to do so after American climber, Ed Viesturs.

Eight-thousander ascents

 Mount Everest (8848 m), spring 1993, with bottled oxygen
 Dhaulagiri (8167 m), fall 1993
 K2 (8611 m), summer 1994
 Lhotse (8516 m), spring 1995
 Makalu (8483 m), spring 1995
 Mount Everest (8848 m), spring 1997, without bottled oxygen
 Manaslu (8163 m), spring 1999
 Dhaulagiri (8167 m), spring 1999
 Shishapangma (8013 m), spring 2001
 Nanga Parbat (8125 m), summer 2001
 Mount Everest (8848 m), spring 2004
 Cho Oyu (8201 m), 22 April 2005
 Annapurna (8091 m), 12 May 2005
 Kanchenjunga (8586 m), 14 May 2006
 Gasherbrum II (8035 m), 8 July 2008
 Broad Peak (8051 m), 31 July 2008
 Gasherbrum I (8080 m), 26 July 2009

Other notable ascents/attempts
In the Alps:
 Frendo ridge
 Bonatti pillar
 Les Courtes, north wall (Swiss route)

In the Pamir:
 Pik Kommunisma (7495 m) and Pik Korsenevskaja (7105 m), summer 1993
 Pik Kommunisma (7495 m). Basecamp to basecamp in 36 h.

In the Himalayas:
 Mount Everest (8848 m), spring 1996. Reached 7500 m.
 Broad Peak (8 047 m), 1997. Reached ridge between Main summit and Rocky summit.
 Annapurna (8091 m), spring 2000. Failed to summit.
 Annapurna (8091 m), spring 2002. Reached 7300 m.
 Kangchenjunga (8 586 m), spring 2003. Reached 7100 m.

Elsewhere:
 Mount Vinson (4892 m), winter 1996. The tallest mountain in Antarctica.
 Four first ascents on the Antarctica, winter 1997. Summited Mount Gardner (4587 m) and an unnamed peak, later unofficially named Mount Sisu (4300 m).

Personal life
Veikka Gustafsson leases the Porkkala Lighthouse and arranges trips there.

See also
List of Mount Everest summiters by number of times to the summit

Notes
In 2008 mid-July Veikka Gustafsson and Fernando Gonzalez-Rubio attempted Gasherbrum I (8068m), but the two were forced to abort the summit bid just before 100m due to bad weather (snowstorm, total whiteout). On 26 July 2009 he prevailed in a second attempt, along with Japanese climber Kazuya Hiraide and Bulgarian climbers Nilolay Petkov, Doychin Boyanov, Boyan Petrov and Nikolay Valkov.

References

Finnish mountain climbers
1968 births
Living people
Summiters of all 14 eight-thousanders